Planet Sound was a Teletext music page on ITV and Channel 4 in the UK, active from 1997 until 2009. It was broadcast on analogue Teletext from page 340, and on digital Teletext from page 820. From 24 May 2007, Planet Sound was also available to read online via the Teletext website. The pages were all simultaneously updated daily at 10pm.

History
Teletext's predecessor ORACLE ran a similar music section in the 1980s. Future Planet Sound editor John Earls had reader reviews published, aged 14, in ORACLE's Blue Suede Views of 1987 albums by ABC, Pet Shop Boys and Westworld, under the pseudonym Jetty.

Planet Sound (named after the Pixies song "Planet of Sound") began in 1997, when its chief writer was Stephen Eastwood. Other past writers for Planet Sound include Jacqui Swift (now a music writer for The Sun's Friday entertainment supplement "Something For The Weekend"), Alistair Clay and Andy Panos. Its chief writer from January 2001 was John Earls.

In November 2008 Earls became Planet Sound's sole writer, as the other freelancers were made redundant. Regular freelancers included: Ian Gittins, who also writes about music for The Guardian; Colin Irwin, the former Planet Sound editor and folk music expert who is regularly a judge on the Mercury Music Prize; Ric Rawlins, Reviews Editor of online music magazine Artrocker; New Musical Express freelancer Kat Lister; MTV journalist Tom Thorogood; Innes Weir, who also contributes to music magazine M8; and Natalie Shaw.

It was announced on 17 July 2009 that Planet Sound was to end in January 2010. This was brought forward slightly and the final Planet Sound was published on Monday 14 December 2009. The final edition featured many musicians sharing their favourite memories of Planet Sound and Teletext, and a final Void viewers page followed by a final message from John Earls.

Following the closure of Planet Sound, Earls established a record label called WET Records. A Facebook group page titled "Planet Sound Lives" features contributions from many previous readers and characters from the Void.

Music coverage
Planet Sound covered all genres of music, but primarily indie rock, promoting many underground artists as well as more established acts. Planet Sound also helped to discover the band Hope of the States via its weekly demo page. Others to receive favourable demo reviews include Maxïmo Park, Nine Black Alps, Kubichek!, Luxembourg, Komakino, Shady Bard, Calvin Harris, The Twilight Sad, The Strange Death of Liberal England, The Coolabahs and The Others.

Other acts that were promoted in the early stages of their careers include Arctic Monkeys, Kaiser Chiefs, Razorlight, Arcade Fire, Franz Ferdinand, Keane, Editors, Snow Patrol, Klaxons, Kasabian, HARD-Fi, Elbow, The Magic Numbers, The Feeling, Scissor Sisters, The Killers, Guillemots, iLiKETRAiNS, The Maccabees, The Twang, Jamie T, Liam Frost, Amy Winehouse, Dizzee Rascal, Little Man Tate, The Courteeners, Patrick Watson and The Metros.

End of year polls
Planet Sound ran a Top 50 for the best singles and albums each year, as decided by John Earls and - until he left Teletext in 2005 - its then-editor, Colin Irwin. Planet Sound had a policy of only including one release per artist per year, so that anyone with a mention in Top 50 singles of the year will not be included in that year's Top 50 albums, and vice versa.

Album of the Year

Single of the Year

References

External links
 Teletext Website
 An interview with Planet Sound's John Earls
 WET Records official website

Music magazines published in the United Kingdom
Channel 4
Magazines established in 1997
Magazines disestablished in 2009
Teletext
Defunct magazines published in the United Kingdom